The American Respiratory Care Foundation is a non-profit organization founded by the American Association for Respiratory Care formed to provide funding for research in the field of pulmonology and respiratory care.  Formed in 1974 as the American Respiratory Therapy Foundation and then changed to the American Respiratory Care Foundation in 1986.  The ARCF is a partner with the United States Environmental Protection Agency, who has awarded grants to the ARCF in order to help fund research directly related to asthma and asthma education.

Primary funding
Undergraduate Student Awards — The ARCF previously supported individuals who were progressing toward an Associate of Science in Respiratory Therapy but ceased that support in 2011 changing the requirement to a student progressing toward a Bachelor of Science in Respiratory Therapy by either direct route or a bridge programme.
Scholarships and education grants
Morton B. Duggan, Jr. Memorial Education Recognition Award
Jimmy A. Young Memorial Education Recognition Award
NBRC/AMP William W. Burgin, Jr. MD Education Recognition Award
NBRC/AMP Robert M. Lawrence, MD Education Recognition Award

Postgraduate Student Awards
Research Fellowships / Abstract Awards
Achievement Awards
Literary Awards
Research Grants  — Research in respiratory care, pulmonology, sleep medicine and critical care medicine is one of the ARCF's primary missions.
International Fellowships
Community Grants

International fellowship
The International Fellowship Program was established in 1990 as a method of expanding respiratory care practices internationally by inviting physicians and nurses among other health professionals  to shadow respiratory therapists to observe the practice and application in medicine.

See also
Lambda Beta Society
National Board for Respiratory Care

References

External links
 Official website
 Anti Snoring Solutions

Non-profit organizations based in Irving, Texas
Pulmonology and respiratory therapy organizations
Medical and health organizations based in Texas